Year 1083 (MLXXXIII) was a common year starting on Sunday (link will display the full calendar) of the Julian calendar.

Events 
By place

 Europe 
 January 6 – A Castilian army, under Count Gonzalo Salvadórez and his son-in-law Ramiro Garcés, Lord of Calahorra, child of the late King García Sánchez III of Pamplona, enters the surrendered bastian of Rueda, but are then treacherously set upon and killed. Gonzalo, Ramiro, and Ramiro's illegitimate half-brother Sancho Garcés are among the many nobles to lose their lives, in what will be remembered as the 'disaster' or 'treachery of Rueda'.
 Castilian forces under Alfonso VI reconquer Talavera de la Reina in the Taifa of Toledo (modern Spain).
 King Sancho Ramírez of Pamplona and Aragon, conquers Graus (located in the Pyrenees).
 Summer – Emperor Henry IV besieges Pope Gregory VII in Castel Sant'Angelo at Rome.

 England 
 King William I (the Conqueror) imprisons his half-brother Odo of Bayeux for planning a military expedition to Italy.

 Africa 
 Ceuta falls to the Almoravids, after a five-year siege.

Births 
 December 1 – Anna Komnene, Byzantine princess (d. 1153)
 Florine of Burgundy, French noblewoman and crusader (d. 1097)
 Jindřich Zdík (or Henry Zdík), bishop of Olomouc (d. 1150)
 Li Gang, Chinese politician and Grand Chancellor (d. 1140)
 Otto IV, count palatine of Bavaria (approximate date)
 Qadi Ayyad, Almoravid imam and chief judge (qadi) (d. 1149)
 Raymond du Puy, French knight and Grand Master (d. 1160)
 Shin Panthagu, Burmese Buddhist monk and primate (d. 1174)
 Viacheslav I Vladimirovich, Grand Prince of Kiev (d. 1154)

Deaths 
 January 6 
 Gonzalo Salvadórez, Spanish nobleman
 Ramiro Garcés, Spanish nobleman
 Sancho Garcés, Spanish nobleman
 January 11 – Otto of Nordheim, duke of Bavaria
 September 2 – Munjong of Goryeo, Korean ruler (b. 1019)
 November 2 – Matilda of Flanders, queen of England
 December 5 – Sunjong of Goryeo, Korean ruler (b. 1047)
 Adelelm of Jumièges, Norman monk and abbot
 Basil Apokapes (or Apocapes), Byzantine general
 Ermengarde of Tonnerre, French noblewoman
 Nicodemus of Palermo, Italian bishop and saint
 Robert de Grandmesnil, Norman nobleman
 Theodora Anna Doukaina, Venetian dogaressa (b. 1058)
 Touzi Yiqing, Chinese Zen Buddhist monk (d. 1032)
 Zeng Gong, Chinese scholar and historian (b. 1019)

References